Colonel Sir Hugh Trefusis Brassey  (5 October 1915 – 10 April 1990) was a British soldier and magistrate.

Background
Born on 5 October 1915, Brassey was the son of Lieutenant-Colonel Edgar Hugh Brassey, grandson of Henry Arthur Brassey, and his wife Margaret Harriet Trefusis, daughter of Hon. Walter Rodolph Trefusis. Brassey was educated at Eton College and at the Royal Military College, Sandhurst.

Career
He joined in the Royal Scots Greys as second lieutenant in 1935 During the Second World War, he was involved in the Syria-Lebanon Campaign in 1941 and the Battle of El Alamein in the following year. He took part in the Salerno Landings of 1943 and also in the Normandy Landings of 1944. In 1944, Brassey was decorated with the Military Cross and the French Croix de Guerre. After the war, he was transferred as lieutenant-colonel to the Royal Wiltshire Yeomanry in 1955.

In the New Year Honours 1959 Brassey was awarded an Officer of the Order of the British Empire. He was appointed aide-de-camp to Queen Elizabeth II in 1964, a post he held for five years. In 1974, Brassey was appointed colonel of the Royal Scots Dragoon Guards.

He entered the Yeomen of the Guard as exon in 1964 and became its ensign in 1970. Brassey was promoted to adjutant and clerk of the cheque the year thereafter and finally to lieutenant in 1979. Following his retirement in 1985, he was made as a Knight Commander of the Royal Victorian Order.

He was High Sheriff of Wiltshire in 1959 and represented the county also as Justice of the Peace. Having been already Deputy Lieutenant from 1956 and Vice Lord Lieutenant from 1968, Brassey was nominated Lord Lieutenant of Wiltshire in 1981, an office he held until 1989. He was invested a Knight of the Venerable Order of Saint John in 1982.

Family
On 18 July 1939, he married Joyce Patricia Kingscote (1917–2006), daughter of Captain Maurice John Kingscote, and had by her three daughters and two sons. He died on 10 April 1990.

References

1915 births
1990 deaths
Hugh Trefusis Brassey
British Army personnel of World War II
Recipients of the Croix de Guerre 1939–1945 (France)
High Sheriffs of Wiltshire
Knights Commander of the Royal Victorian Order
Knights of the Order of St John
Lord-Lieutenants of Wiltshire
Officers of the Order of the British Empire
People educated at Eton College
Recipients of the Military Cross
Royal Scots Greys officers
Graduates of the Royal Military College, Sandhurst
Royal Wiltshire Yeomanry officers